Timuzsin Schuch (born 5 June 1985) is a Hungarian handball player for Ferencvárosi TC and the Hungarian national team.

He represented his country at five European Championships (2010, 2012, 2014, 2016, 2018), four World Championships (2011, 2013, 2017, 2019) and one Olympics (2012).

Personal
His father is Hungarian, while his mother is Mongolian. The couple got to know each other in Budapest, where Schuch's mother studied.

His name, Timuzsin also refers to his Mongolian roots, as it was the birth name of Genghis Khan.

Achievements
Nemzeti Bajnokság I:
Winner: 2005, 2012, 2013, 2014, 2015, 2016, 2017
Magyar Kupa:
Winner: 2012, 2013, 2014, 2015, 2016, 2017
Liga Națională:
Winner: 2009, 2010
Junior World Championship:
Bronze Medalist: 2005

Individual awards
 Hungarian Best Defensive Player Of The Year: 2009, 2012, 2013, 2015, 2016
 Silver Cross of the Cross of Merit of the Republic of Hungary (2012)
Best defender of EHF Champions League: 2013, 2014, 2016

References

External links

Timuzsin Schuch player profile on MKB Veszprém official website
Timuzsin Schuch career statistics at Worldhandball

Hungarian male handball players
Living people
1985 births
People from Nagyatád
HC Dobrogea Sud Constanța players
Expatriate handball players
Hungarian expatriate sportspeople in Romania
Handball players at the 2012 Summer Olympics
Olympic handball players of Hungary
Veszprém KC players
Sportspeople from Somogy County